The 2005 Dunlop MSA British Touring Car Championship season was the 48th British Touring Car Championship (BTCC) season. As in 2004, there were ten racing weekends at nine different circuits; each round comprising three races, making a thirty round competition in total.

Changes for 2005

Teams and drivers
After 2004 saw the BTCC boasting its largest number of entries since the height of the Super Touring era in the 1990s, the following season brought a significant decline in interest.   Proton and Honda pulled their manufacturer support from the series, with many of the smaller independent teams also deciding against returning.

Reigning champions Vauxhall stayed on as one of the two remaining manufacturers, dropping its Astra Coupe after four straight titles with the chassis, and introducing the all new Astra Sport Hatch (again prepared by Triple 8).  Reigning champion James Thompson had left the BTCC to contest the World Touring Car Championship with Alfa Romeo, leaving the 2004 runner-up and 2003 champion Yvan Muller to head the team. SEAT Cupra Cup graduate Gavin Smith joined the team after appearing in an Astra Coupe for GA Motorsport at one meeting in 2004, and Colin Turkington moved into Thompson's seat after two promising seasons with the WSR MG squad.

Their only manufacturer opposition came from SEAT, expanding their effort to three Super 2000-spec Toledos for their second season.  2001 champion Jason Plato remained as team leader, but Rob Huff departed to join the Chevrolet WTCC campaign.  He was replaced by Luke Hines, moving from Vauxhall, with James Pickford taking the third seat as reward for winning the SEAT Cupra Cup in 2004.

Team Dynamics took a brave gamble by replacing their Honda Civic Type Rs with a pair of brand new, self-developed Integras.  Matt Neal and Dan Eaves remained as drivers. A third car was entered late in the season for Gareth Howell in order to support Neal's title campaign.  West Surrey Racing again campaigned the MG ZS as an independent entry after MG Rover withdrew their support at the end of 2003. Rob Collard moved from his self-run Astra Coupe to fill Colin Turkington's seat, but a second driver with sufficient budget could not be found.

Arena Motorsport also continued their campaign despite losing manufacturer support, entering a single Honda Civic Type-R for the returning Tom Chilton from the second round onwards.  The only other full-time returnees were Synchro Motorsport, with James Kaye driving their ex-works Civic Type-R once again.

Two new squads joined the series, both on very low budgets.  SpeedEquipe (as HPI Racing) graduated from the Renault Clio Cup together with their drivers Richard Williams and Ian Curley, to run Lexus IS200s, while Fast-Tec Motorsports and team owner/driver Mark Proctor moved from the SCSA stock car series to run the Astra Coupe that Rob Collard had taken to the Independents title in 2003.

Kartworld Racing returned mid-season with team principal Jason Hughes again racing an ex-works MG ZS, as did Tech-Speed Motorsport running their Astra Coupe (now bio-ethanol powered) for rookie Fiona Leggate. Daniels Motorsport entered another Astra Coupe for Andy Neate for the final round at Brands Hatch.

Other changes
 Dunlop were announced as the new title sponsor of the series
 The grid for race three was determined by race two's finishing order but with the top ten positions reversed. In 2004 this rule had applied to race two based on the finishing order of race one.
 The cars of the championship's top five drivers carried "Championship Ballast" for each race meeting's practice, qualifying and first race. Success Ballast was then carried in race two by the top five finishers from race one and in race three by the top five finishers from race two respectively.
 'Negative' ballast for finishing outside the top five in races was abolished
 Tyres were limited to 16 new slicks per race weekend, but with no limit on wet-weather tyres
 All teams were permitted only up to four days' testing during the season
 Teams were permitted to build their own Super 2000 specification cars and enter them for the championship even if they did not have proper FIA homologation. Provided they met all current S2000 requirements the BTCC was able to grant the cars 'local homologation'.

Teams and drivers

Season Calendar
All races were held in the United Kingdom (excepting Mondello Park round that held in Ireland).

Championship Standings

No driver may collect more than one "Lead a Lap" point per race no matter how many laps they lead.
Race 1 polesitter receives 1 point.

Drivers Championship
(key)

Note: bold signifies pole position (1 point given in first race only, and race 2 and 3 poles are based on race results), italics signifies fastest lap (1 point given all races) and * signifies at least one lap in the lead (1 point given all races).

Manufacturers Championship

Teams Championship

Independents Trophy

Independent Teams Championship

References

External links 
 btcc.net
 touring-cars.net
 btccpages.com 

2005 Season
Touring Car Championship season